St. Mary's Catholic Model High School is an independent, co-educational, Catholic, day and boarding school, located in Port Harcourt, Rivers State, Nigeria. As its name indicates, its patron saint is Mary, mother of Jesus. Its motto is "Faith, Knowledge and Love". The school was founded and officially opened on 25 September 2006. The proprietor is His Lordship, Most Rev. Camillus Archibong Etokudoh.

Administration
Located within the Diocese of Port Harcourt, the school is run by the Sisters of the Immaculate Heart of Mary, Mother of Christ. The sixth and current chaplain is Rev. Fr. John Dumale while the school principal is Rev. Sr. Mary Breda Chilaka.

Chaplains
Former chaplains of the school include:
Rt. Rev. Monsignor Peter Ohochukwu
Rev. Father Joseph Abah
Rev. Father Leo Eke
Rev. Father Poroma
Rev. Father Felix Odu

See also

 Education in Nigeria
 List of Roman Catholic churches in Port Harcourt

References

External links

2006 establishments in Nigeria
2000s establishments in Rivers State
Boarding schools in Rivers State
Co-educational boarding schools
Educational institutions established in 2006
Catholic boarding schools
Roman Catholic Diocese of Port Harcourt
Roman Catholic secondary schools in Nigeria
Schools in Port Harcourt
Secondary schools in Rivers State